Emamzadeh Aqil (also Romanized as Emāmzādeh ‘Aqīl) is a village in Korbal Rural District, in the Central District of Kharameh County, Fars Province, Iran. At the 2006 census, its population was 14, in 14 families.

References 

Populated places in Kharameh County